"Dear X (You Don't Own Me)" or "Dear X, You Don't Own Me" is a song by Christian metal band Disciple from their 2010 album Horseshoes & Handgrenades. It was released as the first single on July 20, 2010. The song peaked at No. 30 on the Hot Christian Songs chart. It lasted 21 weeks on the overall chart, their longest charting single on the chart The song is played in a F minor key at 138 beats per minute.

Composition 
The song is written in the format of a letter. Lead vocalist Kevin Young explained to Kevin Davis of New Release Tuesday that they had written the song as if they were writing a letter to the things of their past. The name "Dear X" was chosen so it would not sound like "Dear Ex," as if addressed to an ex-girlfriend.

Music video 
The music video for the single "Dear X (You Don't Own Me"" was released on May 20, 2013.

Charts

References 

2010 singles
Disciple (band) songs
2010 songs
Songs written by Ben Glover